Kingini Kombu is a 1983 Indian Malayalam film, directed by Jayan Adiyattu. The film stars Jagathy Sreekumar, Nedumudi Venu, Jalaja and Sreenath in the lead roles. The film has musical score by Raveendran.

Cast
Jagathy Sreekumar
Nedumudi Venu
Jalaja
Sreenath
Vandana

Soundtrack
The music was composed by Raveendran and the lyrics were written by Mullanezhi.

References

External links
 

1983 films
1980s Malayalam-language films